Arkan Simaan (born 1945) is a Lebanese-French novelist.

He was born in Lebanon in 1945. When he was two years old, his family immigrated to Brazil and settled in the city of Anápolis near Brasilia. The 1964 Brazilian coup d'état overthrew the government of João Goulart just as Simaan had begun studying physics at the University of São Paulo. In response to this, he became a student activist. Sought by the political police and sentenced to jail in absentia, he went underground. His name was then cited in several prosecutions. Forced to flee Brazil, he arrived in Paris in 1970.

After a few years in France, Simaan refrained from activities that were connected with his prior political involvement. In Paris he resumed his studies in physics at the University Paris Diderot. He then attended the Institut Supérieur des Matériaux et de la Construction Mécanique from which he received an engineering degree. Following a short spell in industry, he realized that he wanted to teach, so he obtained the agrégation in physics.

In 2012 he was one of the founders of Planète Amazone, a French non-governmental organization defending indigenous peoples. He took part in the travels in Europe of the chief Raoni.

Arkan Simaan is member of the scientific patronage committee of Association Française pour l'Information Scientifique

Works 

All his books were originally written in French, and many of them have won awards.
 (With Joëlle Fontaine) "L'Image du Monde des Babyloniens à Newton" (Adapt Editions, Paris, 1998)
 "Cette sentence vous fait plus peur qu'à moi-même : Giordano Bruno" (Cahiers rationalistes, 2000)
 "La science au péril de sa vie – les aventuriers de la mesure du monde" (Vuibert / Adapt, Paris, 2001.) In 2002 this book was awarded Prize of Special Book in Astronomy (Prix Spécial du livre d'astronomie)
 "Vénus devant le soleil – comprendre et observer un phénomène astronomique" (Vuibert / Adapt, 2003). This book concerns the transit of Venus across the Sun.
 "L'Image du Monde de Newton à Einstein" (Vuibert / Adapt, Paris, 2005)
 "Le paradoxe de la science: Fritz Haber" (Cahiers rationalistes n° 579, November 2005)
 "L'Écuyer d'Henri le Navigateur" (Éditions Harmattan, Paris, 2007)

Articles 
 Articles and reviews for the rationalist journal Science et pseudo-sciences (in French)

Videos 
 (fr) Arkan Simaan : La science en questions II série À Ciel ouvert 3min 43s
 (fr) Arkan Simaan : La science en questions II série À Ciel ouvert 3min 58s

References

External links
 Adapt Éditions
 Futura-sciences
 The transit of Venus across the Sun
 The transit of Venus: a stroke of luck for teachers
 The Image of the World from Newton to Einstein

1945 births
French science writers
Brazilian science writers
Brazilian skeptics
Science communicators
Living people
Brazilian emigrants to France
Brazilian non-fiction writers
Writers from Paris
French historical novelists
Writers of historical fiction set in the Middle Ages
Lebanese emigrants to Brazil
French male novelists
French male non-fiction writers
University of São Paulo alumni